The Audie Award for Multi-Voiced Performance, established in 1996, is one of the Audie Awards presented annually by the Audio Publishers Association (APA). It awards excellence in audiobooks narrated by multiple performers who do not interact. Only English-language texts are eligible.

Between 1996 and 2001, two awards were presented annually, one for multi-voiced performance and one for multi-voiced narration.

Winners and finalists

2000s

2010s

2020s

References

External links 

 Audie Award winners
 Audie Awards official website

Audie Awards
Awards established in 1996
English-language literary awards